The Levi B Frost House, also known as the Asa Barns’ Tavern, is an historic building in the Marion village of  Southington, Connecticut. The home represents over two centuries of Southington history. Appearing twice on the National Register of Historic Places, as an individual structure and as a part of the Marion Historic District, the house is significant both architecturally and historically for its connection to United States and New England history.

Asa Barns established a tavern in this building at around 1765, when Marion Avenue was part of a north–south road connecting Bristol and New Haven. Known also as the Barnes Tavern (the "e" in Barnes first appearing in land records in 1825), for many years the Inn hosted numerous travelers, among them a French General and his officers. During the American Revolutionary War, on June 26, 1781, troops under French general Jean-Baptiste Donatien de Vimeur, comte de Rochambeau established their eighth campsite of their route nearby on French Hill, and Landlord Barns entertained Rocchambeau and his officers in his tavern for the four nights of the encampment.  Barns gave a ball at the tavern in their honor, at which a large number of the young women of the vicinity were present and esteemed it an honor to have a cotillon with the polite foreigners. Rochambeau and his officers visited Barns' Tavern again on the return march on October 27, 1782.

Asa Barns lived in the house until his death in 1819, after which his son leased the building to Micah Rugg and Levi B. Frost, two pioneers in the manufacture of carriage bolts that started in Marion in the 1840s. The Frost-Rugg partnership did not last long, however, and the men parted ways. Frost, a blacksmith who specialized in shoeing oxen and making hand-forged bolts and other products, bought the house from Barns outright in 1820.  The house served as his blacksmith shop, his home and country store. His shop became famous for shoeing of oxen. By using a particular contrivance invented by Frost that controlled the oxen during the shoeing process, his shop attracted customers from many miles away. He began a bolt manufacturing business from this house, and in 1842 moved his operation across the street to a factory building.  Frost then manufactured bolts in the shop across the street from his house and, doing business as L. B. Frost & Son, originated the first lathe for turning bolt heads. In 1844, the company began making nuts and managed to stay in business into the early 20th century.

Frost became a leader in the young American bolt industry. In addition to being an enterprising businessman, Frost was a local leader in the community, having served his community in several local offices and in the State House for many years. Frost died in the house on December 28, 1865, but the home stayed in his family into the 1920s.

The front part of the building burned and the was rebuilt in 1836 by Frost, then a wealthy businessman, in the newer Greek Revival style that was popular in the middle of the 19th century, incorporating a full pedimented gable, three-bay facade, recessed front doorway that is flanked by plain pilasters that support an entablature with projecting cyma cornice characteristic of Greek Revival buildings. What is uncharacteristic of the Greek Revival style is the building's length of 50 feet, which may be the result of the original 18th-century structure. Investigators believe that the large rear room with its well-worn chestnut planks, large cooking fireplace with bee hive oven and stone hearth, gouged dado and separate exterior door, appears older than the rest of the house and is likely to be the pre-1836 taproom of the former tavern. The supporting beams under the rear portion of the house are tree trunks with bark intact, indicating that this part of the building is older. The front of the building generally appears to be newer, as it bears the most characteristic details of the Greek Revival style, including wide pine floors, a front stairway rising to the left, a large front room on the right and detailing of stairway treads, risers, railing and handrail that appear to be original of the mid-century design.

The house has remained a private residence, and in 1987, came under the protection of the National Park Service when listed to the National Register of Historic Places for its architectural and historical significance. It is also part of the Marion Historic District.

See also
 Washington–Rochambeau Revolutionary Route
 List of historic sites preserved along Rochambeau's route
 National Register of Historic Places listings in Southington, Connecticut

References

Houses on the National Register of Historic Places in Connecticut
Houses in Southington, Connecticut
Historic places on the Washington–Rochambeau Revolutionary Route
National Register of Historic Places in Hartford County, Connecticut
Historic district contributing properties in Connecticut